The Vultee P-66 Vanguard was a United States Army Air Forces fighter aircraft. It was initially ordered by Sweden, but by the time the aircraft were ready for delivery in 1941, the United States would not allow them to be exported, designating them as P-66s and retaining them for defensive and training purposes. Eventually, a large number were sent to China where they were pressed into service as combat aircraft with mixed results.

Design and development
The Vultee Vanguard was the product of an idea conceived in the late 1930s by the Vultee Aircraft Division of the Aviation Manufacturing Corporation of developing four aircraft designed for different roles from a set of common wings and aft fuselage and tail assemblies. The company assigned four model designations: V-48 to a single-seat fighter, BC-51 to a basic combat trainer, B-54 to an advanced trainer, and BC-54D as a basic trainer. Eventually, the BC-51 would become the Army Air Corps BC-3 and the BC-54D, the BT-13.

In 1938, Richard W. Palmer started the detailed design of the V-48 fighter member of the quartet. The aircraft featured a metal-covered, semi-monocoque fuselage and fully retractable landing gear, and was powered by a Pratt & Whitney R-1830 air-cooled radial engine. During construction of the first prototype, a decision was made to lengthen the propeller shaft and install a tight cowling to provide a pointed nose to reduce drag. The first aircraft flew in September 1939 piloted by Vance Breese, and was assigned registration number NX21755. The fighter was named the Vanguard. On 9 May 1940, the prototype collided with a Lockheed Sirius while landing at Vultee airfield, the impact severing one main undercarriage leg. Nevertheless, Breese skillfully landed the airplane with little additional damage. It was subsequently rebuilt with the orthodox cowling as employed on subsequent machines.

Flight tests revealed the aircraft was suffering from inadequate cooling. Measures to modify the cooling ducting were of little avail. After re-evaluating the design, and noting that the insignificant drag decrease was not worth the added weight and ducting problems, the second prototype, which was assigned the model number V-48X and registration NX19999, was modified with a conventional cowl and the first aircraft were similarly modified. The second aircraft first flew on February 11, 1940. As a result of flight tests, a number of changes were made to the design including substantially increasing the areas of the horizontal and vertical tail surfaces.

Operational history

On 6 February 1940, the Swedish government ordered 144 Vanguards as the V-48C. The production prototype flew on 6 September 1940. The model V-48C was similar to the V-48X except for installation of a later version of the R-1830 engine with better higher altitude performance and provision for four  machine guns in the wings and two  machine guns in the fuselage.

When production deliveries began in September 1941, the U.S. government placed an embargo on exporting the aircraft to Sweden. In the aftermath of Pearl Harbor, all Vanguards were assigned the designation P-66. Production ended in April 1942. Approximately 50 aircraft were retained by the USAAF and primarily used at pursuit training bases in the western U.S. and were deployed to the 14th Pursuit Group in defensive roles. Although pilots were impressed by the P-66's handling, the type was considered less than robust and a tendency to ground-loop led to 15 aircraft being destroyed in landing accidents.

The British government took possession of 100 P-66s as the Vanguard I with plans to use the aircraft as an advanced trainer in Canada. After concluding their trials however, the British then relinquished the aircraft to China where 104 Vanguards (including USAAC examples) were shipped under the Lend-Lease program. They were originally intended to equip the 3rd American Volunteer Group (AVG); however, plans for additional groups were dropped after the Japanese attack on Pearl Harbor.

The Chinese received the assembled fighters via India by late 1942; Chinese Vanguards had USAAF insignia and serials as well as Chinese markings and Vultee serials on factory models. The undistinguished combat record of the Vanguard in China was due to problems that began in transit where a number of Vanguards were destroyed during tests in India and others lost while en route to China. Assembled P-66s were deemed unairworthy and abandoned at Karachi resulting in only 12 Vanguards on station at Kunming with the 74th Fighter Squadron of the 23rd Fighter Group, but this unit saw little action. Two Chinese squadrons from the 3rd Group and the 5th Group based at An-Su saw combat action with the Vanguard from August 1943 onward. However, many P-66s were destroyed on the ground during Japanese attacks while several were shot down in error when they were mistaken for the Nakajima firm's Ki-43 "Oscar" and Ki-44 "Tojo".

The P-66 in Chinese service was largely replaced by Curtiss P-40s in 1943. A number of surviving P-66 Vanguards were placed in caves for storage at Chungking for use in the civil war against Mao's Communists. As late as 1947, many were reportedly still in their crates.

Operators

Chinese Nationalist Air Force
3rd Group
5th Group

Royal Air Force, not used, aircraft originally ordered by Sweden, aircraft were delivered to China.

United States Army Air Forces

Specifications (P-66)

See also

References
Notes

Bibliography

Green, William. War Planes of the Second World War, Volume Four: Fighters. London: MacDonald & Co. (Publishers) Ltd., Sixth impression, 1969, First edition 1961. .
Green, William and Gordon Swanborough. WW2 Aircraft Fact Files: US Army Air Force Fighters, Part 2. London: Macdonald and Jane's Publishers Ltd., 1978. .
Mondey, David. The Hamlyn Concise Guide to American Aircraft of World War II. London: Hamlyn Publishing Group Ltd., 1982 (republished 1996 by the Chancellor Press, reprinted 2002). .
Thompson, Jonathan. Vultee Aircraft 1932–1947. Santa Ana, Calif.: Narkiewicz/Thompson, 1992. .

External links

P-66
USAF Museum: P-66 Vanguard
Vultee P-66

Low-wing aircraft
Vultee aircraft
Vultee P-66
Single-engined tractor aircraft
Aircraft first flown in 1939